William H. Walker (July 25, 1847 – June 25, 1913) was a Canadian politician.

Born in Ochiltree Manse, Ayrshire, Scotland, Walker emigrated to Canada in 1858. Walker was elected to the Legislative Assembly of Quebec for Huntingdon in 1900. A Liberal, he was acclaimed in 1904 and 1908. He was re-elected in 1912.

References

1847 births
1913 deaths
Quebec Liberal Party MNAs
Scottish emigrants to pre-Confederation Quebec
Immigrants to the Province of Canada
People from East Ayrshire
Anglophone Quebec people